Call of the Yukon is a 1938 American action/adventure film produced and released by Republic Pictures, directed by John T. Coyle and B. Reeves Eason and starring Richard Arlen and Beverly Roberts. The film features extensive Alaskan location shooting by Norman Dawn who shot several films there.  The film is based on the 1926 novel Swift Lightning A Story Of Wildlife Adventure In The Frozen North by Northern genre writer James Oliver Curwood. The film's working titles were Thunder in Alaska and Swift Lightning.

Plot 
Adventuring author Jean Williams is living in the wilds of Alaska alongside the Eskimo people gathering material for her novel.  She befriends several animals who become her loyal friends such as a pair of bear cubs whose mother has been killed by hunter Gaston Rogers, a talking raven and the bereaved collie Firefly who will not leave the grave of her master, a game warden killed in the line of duty.

The community is imperiled by a pack of wolves and wild dogs, led by a wild dog called Swift Lightning, who are killing all the reindeer.  With the supply of fresh meat gone, the Eskimos are migrating to lands with more food.  Hunter Gaston agrees to take Jean to Nenana, Alaska, along with his furs by dog sled.  Jean, who despises Gaston as being more savage and blood thirsty than the four-legged predators, is followed by her loyal animals.

The pair face attacks by wolves, an avalanche and being trapped on a river whose ice floes are melting.

Cast

References

External links 
 
 

1938 films
1930s action adventure films
American black-and-white films
Republic Pictures films
Films directed by B. Reeves Eason
Films set in Alaska
Films shot in Alaska
Films directed by Norman Dawn
American action adventure films
Films based on novels by James Oliver Curwood
1930s English-language films
1930s American films